"Spectrum" is a song by English indie rock band Florence and the Machine from their second studio album Ceremonials (2011). It was written by lead singer Florence Welch and Paul Epworth with production being handled by Epworth. The band premiered the song during a concert at Brooklyn's Creators Project on 15 October 2011, prior to the release of the album. The album version of "Spectrum" is a downtempo orchestral pop, dance-pop and disco song. The accompanying music video for the song premiered on 30 May 2012. It was directed by David LaChapelle and John Byrne.

A remix of the album version of "Spectrum", titled "Spectrum (Say My Name)", was released on 6 July 2012 by Island Records, serving as the fourth single from Ceremonials. Scottish DJ Calvin Harris remixed "Spectrum", producing the uptempo single. "Spectrum (Say My Name)" became the group's first single to peak at number one on the UK Singles Chart, selling 64,816 copies in its first week. It also reached number one in Ireland and Scotland and has peaked within the top five in Australia and New Zealand.

Background and composition
Florence and the Machine premiered "Spectrum" along with two other songs from the album, "Never Let Me Go" and "Heartlines", as part of their set list at Brooklyn's Creators Project on 15 October 2011, two weeks before the release of the album. Musically, "Spectrum" is a downtempo orchestral pop, R&B, krautrock and disco song with drums while backing vocals repeatedly sing "Say my name" throughout the choruses. According to the sheet music published by Universal Music Publishing Group on the website Musicnotes.com, the song is set in the key B minor. The song's beat is set in common time, and moves at a tempo of 124 beats per minute. Welch's vocals span from the note of F#3 to the note of F#5 or B5 in the Calvin Harris remix.

Critical reception
"Spectrum" received mostly positive reviews by critics. While reviewing Ceremonials, Jillian Mapes of Billboard complimented Welch's vocal performance, stating, "'Say my name,' she howls then later croons, both filled with sensuality. Welch's impressive vocal range and volume are firing on all cylinders here." A writer of Rolling Stone praised the song calling it "a huge, churchy tune, even in the context of the band's typically bombastic blend of arena rock and gospel." Lewis Corner from Digital Spy gave the song four stars out of five, saying "if there's one thing latest single 'Spectrum' proves, it's that she knows how to write a distinctive uptempo number without compromising her style." He added that the song "[...] belts over a rapturous chorus complete with rousing piano and delicate strings – demonstrating that techno synths are not the only key to a euphoric hook."

Matthew Cole from Slant Magazine said along with "Lover to Lover" and "Remain Nameless"; "spectacular when taken alone or on a playlist." Kitty Empire from The Guardian gave it a mixed remark, saying "Clubby and kaleidoscopic, 'Spectrum' sounds like another rallying cry." Margaret Wappler of Los Angeles Times said they could hear a "harp gorgeously flutter[s] and dips around her." Chris Saunders from musicOMH compared it, musically, to the song from Florence's previous record Lungs. The Independent commented; "The only time she and The Machine stray from the formula is the Krautrock-disco motorik of 'Spectrum'; elsewhere, declamatory piano chords and burring organ underpin the banked [...]"

Music video

Background
An accompanying music video for the song was released on Florence and the Machine's YouTube account on 30 May 2012. Directed by David LaChapelle and John Byrne, the video depicts ballet dancers of California's Southland Ballet Academy/Festival Ballet Theatre pirouetting, jumping, and dancing around Welch. During an interview, Welch spoke about her collaboration with LaChapelle, "It was a complete dream to work with David LaChapelle. I collected his books as a teenager, and I fantasised that he would direct the video for 'Spectrum' from the moment the song was written. I still can't believe it actually happened, and I'm completely overjoyed that he felt such a connection with the song." During an interview, LaChapelle also spoke about his collaboration with Welch, "It's a beautiful song that really touched me and inspired me to create imagery that matches its power. 'Spectrum' is free of scepticism, irony, and the coldness one finds in a lot of contemporary popular music. It's the opposite—full of light, positivity and authentic joy. I hope that I can do justice to this moving modern classic."

Reception
Upon the release of the video, critics praised Welch's look and the video's dark atmosphere. A writer of Rolling Stone wrote, "Music video legend David LaChappelle rose to the challenge of making a clip for the song, matching its drama and energy with a vivid color pallette and incredibly theatrical staging." Robbie Daw of Idolator stated the video's visual is "as bombastic and over the top as the song itself [...] there's enough completely koo koo eye candy being hurled at us that we're barely even paying attention to the song itself."

Live performances
The band performed the song on first series of the American version of The X Factor during its semi-finals. Florence and the Machine added the song to the set list of their second worldwide Ceremonials Tour (2011–12) where the song was performed during the encore of the concerts along with "No Light, No Light". On 12 September 2012, Florence performed a stripped-down version of the song on Late Night with Jimmy Fallon.

British DJ and producer Ilan Bluestone played a mashup of Spectrum with his song "Under My Skin" during his live set at Madison Square Garden for Above & Beyond's ABGT100 show.

Calvin Harris remix
A remix of the album version of "Spectrum", titled "Spectrum (Say My Name)", was released on 6 July 2012 by Island Records, serving as the fourth single from Ceremonials. Scottish DJ Calvin Harris remixed "Spectrum", producing the uptempo electro house-inspired single. "Spectrum (Say My Name)" received positive reviews from music critics, praising the production and Welch's vocals. Commercially, it became the group's first single to peak at number one on the UK Singles Chart, selling 64,816 copies in its first week. It also reached number one in Ireland and Scotland and has peaked within the top five in Australia and New Zealand.

Background and development
On 25 May 2012, a lyric video was released for the Calvin Harris remix. The song was released as the album's fifth single on 5 July 2012. It was serviced to radio in the UK on 2 July 2012. On the release of the single, the Calvin Harris remix was released. Lewis Corner of Digital Spy commented that "While the single version is near perfection, an accompanying Calvin Harris remix highlights just how big a Florence house anthem can be". The instrumental version of "Spectrum" was used extensively during the BBC's coverage of the London 2012 Olympic Games, often as the backing track to their round-up of the day's sporting action.

Commercial performance
"Spectrum" debuted at number 104 on the UK Singles Chart based on the sales of the album version. On 15 July 2012, following the release of the Calvin Harris remix of the song, it climbed the chart to become the band's first number-one single in the UK, selling 64,816 copies in its first week. The song stayed on top of the chart for three weeks. It also debuted at number 35 on the New Zealand Singles Chart, until rising to number two, becoming the group's first top ten single in that country. It peaked at the top spot in the Republic of Ireland. In the UK, it was the best-selling single of the third quarter of 2012, selling 453,000 copies. The song has sold 554,000 copies in the UK in 2012, and was the 19th best-selling single of 2012. However, in 2013, it was certified platinum for selling over 600,000 copies. It is Florence + the Machine's best-selling single in the United Kingdom.

Track listing

Charts and certifications

Weekly charts

Year-end charts

Certifications

Release history

See also
 List of Billboard Dance Club Songs number ones of 2012

References

External links
 

2012 singles
Florence and the Machine songs
Irish Singles Chart number-one singles
Island Records singles
Music videos directed by David LaChapelle
Number-one singles in Scotland
Song recordings produced by Paul Epworth
Songs written by Paul Epworth
UK Singles Chart number-one singles
Songs written by Florence Welch
2011 songs
Synth-pop songs